The 1981–82 Winnipeg Jets season was the team's third season in the National Hockey League and tenth season overall. The club's on-ice performance vastly improved compared to the previous season when the Jets won only nine games. The Jets finished with a .500 record and, for the first time in its history, qualified for the Stanley Cup Playoffs

Offseason
After a very disappointing 1980-81, in which the Jets won only nine games and finished in last place in the National Hockey League, the club announced on May 14, 1981, that Tom Watt would become the new head coach of the team. Watt spent the 1980-81 season as an assistant coach under Harry Neale on the Vancouver Canucks. This would be Watt's first NHL head coaching job.  The Jets also announced that Dave Christian would become the new captain of the team. Christian, who was a part of the 1980 US Olympic Team that won the gold medal, became the third captain of the team since the Jets joined the NHL.

The NHL announced a new divisional realignment based on geography, as the Jets were shifted from the Smythe Division to the Norris Division, where they would join the Chicago Black Hawks, Detroit Red Wings, Minnesota North Stars, St. Louis Blues and Toronto Maple Leafs.  On June 10, 1981, the Jets went into the 1981 NHL Entry Draft with the first overall selection, and the club used it to select Dale Hawerchuk from the Cornwall Royals of the QMJHL. Hawerchuk scored 81 goals and 183 points in 72 games with Cornwall, followed by 15 goals and 35 points in 19 playoff games with the team, leading them to the President's Cup. At the 1981 Memorial Cup, Hawerchuk had eight goals and 12 points in five games, leading Cornwall to the championship. With their second selection, Winnipeg selected Scott Arniel, who also played with the Cornwall Royals. Arniel had 52 goals and 123 points with Cornwall, followed by 14 goals and 33 points in 19 playoff games, and six goals and eight points in five Memorial Cup games, helping the Royals win the 1981 Memorial Cup.

On July 3, 1981, Winnipeg acquired Bryan Maxwell, Ed Staniowski and Paul MacLean from the St. Louis Blues for Scott Campbell and John Markell. Maxwell, a stay-at-home defenseman, had three goals and 13 points in 40 games with the Blues in 1980-81, while Staniowski posted a 10-3-3 record with a 4.28 GAA in 19 games as a backup to Mike Liut in St. Louis. MacLean had 36 goals and 78 points in 80 games with the Salt Lake Golden Eagles of the CHL.

Twelve days later on July 15, 1981, the Jets were involved in a three-way deal with the Colorado Rockies and Vancouver Canucks. Winnipeg originally traded Ivan Hlinka to the Vancouver Canucks for Brent Ashton and the Canucks fourth round draft pick at the 1982 NHL Entry Draft. The Jets then traded Ashton and their own third round pick in the 1982 NHL Entry Draft to the Colorado Rockies for Lucien DeBlois. DeBlois had 26 goals and 42 points in 74 games with Colorado during the 1980-81 season.

One day before the regular season began, on October 5, 1981, the Jets picked up Serge Savard from the Montreal Canadiens in the waiver draft. Savard, who played with the Canadiens since the 1966-67 season, had four goals and 17 points in 77 games during the 1980-81 season. Savard was a seven time Stanley Cup champion.

Regular season

Final standings

Schedule and results

Playoffs
They faced the St. Louis Blues in the Division Semifinals, losing 3 games to 1.

Player statistics

Awards and records
 Calder Memorial Trophy: Dale Hawerchuk
 Jack Adams Award: Tom Watt

Transactions

Trades

Waivers

Free agents

Draft picks
The Jets selected the following players at the 1981 NHL Entry Draft, which was held at the Montreal Forum in Montreal, Quebec, on June 10, 1981.

NHL Amateur Draft

Farm teams

See also
1981–82 NHL season

References

External links

Winnipeg Jets season, 1981-82
Winnipeg Jets (1972–1996) seasons
Winn